Dark Desire is a Mexican thriller drama streaming television series produced by Argos Comunicación for Netflix. The series stars Maite Perroni, Erik Hayser, Alejandro Speitzer, María Fernanda Yepes, Regina Pavón and Jorge Poza, The start of production was confirmed on 6 May 2019, and it premiered on 15 July 2020.

On 19 August 2020, the series was renewed for a second and final season, which premiered on 2 February 2022. It was also announced that season 1 of Dark Desire was the most watched non-English title on Netflix, amassing 35 million viewers in 28 days or 213.79 million hours.

Synopsis
Alma (Maite Perroni) is a law school professor. She is married to Leonardo (Jorge Poza), a judge who has kept much from her. They are parents of Zoe (Regina Pavón). In this context, Darío (Alejandro Speitzer) and Esteban (Erik Hayser), a police officer, also come into play.

Cast and characters

Main
 Maite Perroni as Alma Quintana Solares, a former lawyer and college professor who begins the affair with Darío behind her family's back.
 Erik Hayser as Esteban Solares, a former police officer and Leonardo's brother, Zoe's uncle and Alma's ex-brother-in-law
 Alejandro Speitzer as Darío Guerra, a college student and mechanic who attends Alma's class and starts to fall in love with her
 María Fernanda Yepes as Brenda Castillo (season 1), Alma's best friend who has recently gone through a divorce. She committed suicide by cutting her wrists, opening a case in which Darío, Leonardo and Esteban were suspects of Brenda's apparent murder due to their connection to her
 Regina Pavón as Zoe Solares, Alma and Leonardo's rebellious daughter and Esteban's niece who is struggling with her sexuality
 Jorge Poza as Leonardo Solares, a highly respected former judge and Alma's ex-husband, Esteban's brother and Zoe's father
 Catherine Siachoque as Lys Antoine (season 2), Darío's aunt and foster mother who had a sexual relationship with him
 Arturo Barba as Íñigo Lazcano (season 2), a lawyer and Julieta's father
 Ariana Saavedra as Julieta Lazcano (season 2), Darío's fiancée who turns up dead the day before their wedding

Recurring
 Paulina Matos as Edith Ballesteros (season 1), Leonardo's assistant whom Alma initially thought to be her husband's mistress
 Leticia Huijara as Lucinda (season 1), Darío's mother
 Claudia Pineda as Patricia García (season 1), one of the detectives in charge of Brenda's case
 Esteban Soberanes as Vallejo (season 1), another of the detectives in charge of Brenda's case
 Samantha Orozco as Rosalba (season 1)
 Fabián Merlo as El Chalán (season 1)
 Tony Valdes as Jacinto (season 1)
 Eligio Meléndez as El Padrino (season 1)
 Carmen Baqué as Nancy (season 1)
 Daniel Damuzi as Carmona (season 1)
 Magali Boysselle as Mónica, a therapist who helps Alma overcome her obsession with Darío. In season 2, she organizes a group of women who had been through similar situations.
 María de Villa as Karina, Zoe's best friend and later girlfriend
 Mahoalli Nassourou as Eugenia Montaño (season 2), the detective in charge of Julieta's case

Episodes

Season 1 (2020)

Season 2 (2022)

Awards and nominations

Notes

References

External links
 
 

2020 Mexican television series debuts
2022 Mexican television series endings
2020s drama television series
Adultery in television
Argos Comunicación telenovelas
Erotic thrillers
Mexican drama television series
Spanish-language Netflix original programming
Television series about educators
Television shows set in Mexico City
Thriller television series